David Winner is a retired American soccer goalkeeper who had an extensive career in Major League Soccer, USISL and the USL A-League.

Player

Youth
Winner graduated from Western High School where he was a 1989 Parade Magazine High School All American soccer player.  He attended Florida International University.  After one season, he transferred to the University of Tampa.  In 1992, the Spartans finished runner-up in the NCAA Division II Men's Soccer Championship.  In 1994, Winner and his teammates won the NCAA Division II championship.  He graduated in 1994 with a bachelor's degree in communications.

Professional
In 1995, Winner turned professional with the Tampa Bay Cyclones of the USISL Pro League.  In 1996, he signed with the Columbus Crew of Major League Soccer.  Winner spent two seasons with the Crew before being waived on June 1, 1998.  In June 1998, he spent time with the New England Revolution.  At the beginning of July, he spent a few games as a backup with the Chicago Fire.  At the end of July, the Miami Fusion signed Winner to a short-term contract after injuries hit the Fusion goalkeeper corps.  He finished the season with the Worcester Wildfire of the USL A-League.  On February 7, 1999, the Colorado Rapids selected Winner in the second round (twentieth overall) of the 1999 MLS Supplemental Draft.  The Rapids released him, but the Kansas City Wizards signed him in March after Tony Meola and Chris Snitko were both injured during the pre-season.  On March 20, 2000, Winner signed with the Connecticut Wolves of the USL A-League. In August 2000, he moved to the Atlanta Silverbacks where he played nine games.  On September 4, 2000, the New England Revolution signed him for the remainder of the season.  In 2001, Winner joined the Indiana Blast of the USL A-League.  In June, the Miami Fusion called him up as a backup goalkeeper.

Coach
In 2009 and 2010 Winner served as the goalkeeper coach for the Austin Aztex of the USL First Division.  In 2012, he was the GK Coach for the  Austin Aztex  (PDL).  He currently is working for the Columbus Crew DA (Development Academy) as a goalie coach.

References

External links
 
 Butler University: David Winner

Living people
1971 births
American soccer coaches
American soccer players
Atlanta Silverbacks players
Chicago Fire FC players
Columbus Crew players
Connecticut Wolves players
FIU Panthers men's soccer players
Indiana Blast players
Jacksonville Cyclones players
Sporting Kansas City players
Major League Soccer players
Miami Fusion players
New England Revolution players
Tampa Spartans men's soccer players
A-League (1995–2004) players
USISL players
Worcester Wildfire players
Colorado Rapids draft picks
Sportspeople from Fort Lauderdale, Florida
Soccer players from Florida
Association football goalkeepers